Spurr Township is a civil township of Baraga County in the U.S. state of Michigan. The population was 262 at the 2020 census.

The township had been organized while it was part of Houghton County. It was one of the four original townships of Baraga County when it was set off from Houghton in 1875. It is named for "Spurr Mountain", the site of an iron ore mine, first named the "Spurr Mountain Mining Company", organized in 1872. Operations ceased in 1878, and then resumed again in 1881 under a reorganized "Spurr Iron Mining Company". A post office named "Spurr Mountain" opened December 30, 1874, and was discontinued December 15, 1887. It was reestablished June 4, 1890, and operated until June 30, 1896.

Communities
There are no incorporated municipalities in the township. There are a few unincorporated communities and historic locales:
 Beaufort Lake is an unincorporated community in the township.
The name comes from the Nestor Lumber Company, which was operating in the area when the Duluth, South Shore and Atlantic Railway (now part of the Soo Line Railroad) built its lines in the region. A depot established near the lumber operations in 1871 was called "Nestoria". A post office was established with the name "Nestoria" on May 11, 1887, and the name of the office was changed to the present spelling on June 4, 1887. The office closed on April 30, 1892, but was re-opened on May 7, 1895. The office was discontinued on February 1, 1974.
It is named for nearby Lake Ruth, Lake George, and Beaufort Lake.

Geography

Demographics
As of the census of 2000, there were 227 people, 105 households, and 78 families residing in the township. The population density was 1.5 per square mile (0.6/km). There were 300 housing units at an average density of 2.0 per square mile (0.8/km). The racial makeup of the township was 98.68% White, 0.44% Asian, 0.44% from other races, and 0.44% from two or more races. Hispanic or Latino of any race were 0.88% of the population. 41.2% were of Finnish, 17.5% German, 6.8% English and 5.6% Polish ancestry according to Census 2000.

There were 105 households, out of which 21.9% had children under the age of 18 living with them, 65.7% were married couples living together, 3.8% had a female householder with no husband present, and 25.7% were non-families. 20.0% of all households were made up of individuals, and 8.6% had someone living alone who was 65 years of age or older. The average household size was 2.16 and the average family size was 2.47.

In the township the population was spread out, with 17.2% under the age of 18, 1.8% from 18 to 24, 23.3% from 25 to 44, 35.7% from 45 to 64, and 22.0% who were 65 years of age or older. The median age was 50 years. For every 100 females, there were 108.3 males. For every 100 females age 18 and over, there were 108.9 males.

The median income for a household in the township was $36,667, and the median income for a family was $40,417. Males had a median income of $27,813 versus $14,821 for females. The per capita income for the township was $17,316. About 4.5% of families and 7.6% of the population were below the poverty line, including 5.7% of those under the age of eighteen and 6.1% of those 65 or over.

References

Townships in Baraga County, Michigan
Townships in Michigan